Eccrinales are an order of eukaryotes, previously thought to be zygomycete fungi belonging to the class Trichomycetes, but now considered to be members of the opisthokont group Mesomycetozoea.

Taxonomy 

 Order: Eccrinales
 Family: Eccrinaceae
 Family: Palavasciaceae
 Family: Parataeniellaceae

References 

Mesomycetozoea
Opisthokont orders